The Bergkopf is an 857 metre high, thickly forested mountain in the Sparneck Forest in Germany's Fichtel Mountains.

It lies in the northern chain of the Fichtel Mountain Horseshoe, near the crest of the Großer Waldstein. On its northern slopes is the granite rock formation of  Kleiner Waldstein, and, further north towards Sparneck, the source of the Förmitz river. To the northeast  lies the granite mountain of Hoher Stein and, on its slopes, is the source of the Lamitz. To the southwest towards Weißenstadt, a monument commemorates the forester, Johann Braun, who died at that spot on 12 July 1881.

Literature 
 Dietmar Herrmann: Lexikon Fichtelgebirge - Bayerisches Vorgtland, Steinwald, Bayreuther Land. Ackermann Verlag. Hof, 2000. . p.61.

External links 

 Entry on the webpage of the  Fichtelgebirge Club
 Lakes and rivers on the FGV site

Mountains of the Fichtelgebirge
Mountains under 1000 metres